A Ragone plot is a plot used for comparing the energy density of various energy-storing devices. On such a chart the values of specific energy (in W·h/kg) are plotted versus specific power (in W/kg). Both axes are logarithmic, which allows comparing performance of very different devices. Ragone plots can reveal information about gravimetric energy density, but do not convey details about volumetric energy density.

The Ragone plot was first used to compare performance of batteries. However, it is suitable for comparing any energy-storage devices, as well as energy devices such as engines, gas turbines, and fuel cells.  The plot is named after David V. Ragone.

Conceptually, the vertical axis describes how much energy is available per unit mass, while the horizontal axis shows how quickly that energy can be delivered, otherwise known as power per unit mass. A point in a Ragone plot represents a particular energy device or technology.

The amount of time (in hours) during which a device can be operated at its rated power is given as the ratio between the specific energy (Y-axis) and the specific power (X-axis).  This is true regardless of the overall scale of the device, since a larger device would have proportional increases in both power and energy. Consequently, the iso curves (constant operating time) in a Ragone plot are straight lines. 

For electrical systems, the following equations are relevant:

where V is voltage (V), I electric current (A), t time (s) and m mass (kg).

References

Capacitors
Battery (electricity)
Charts